Polk Township is a township in DeKalb County, in the U.S. state of Missouri.

Polk Township was established in 1845, taking its name from President James K. Polk.

References

Townships in Missouri
Townships in DeKalb County, Missouri